Yala (යාල) National Park is the most visited and second largest national park in Sri Lanka, bordering the Indian Ocean. The park consists of five blocks, two of which are now open to the public, and also adjoining parks. The blocks have individual names such as, Ruhuna National Park (Block 1), and Kumana National Park or 'Yala East' for the adjoining area. It is situated in the southeast region of the country, and lies in Southern Province and Uva Province. Yala was designated as a wildlife sanctuary in 1900, and, along with Wilpattu was one of the first two national parks in Sri Lanka, having been designated in 1938. The park is best known for its variety of wild animals. It is important for the conservation of Sri Lankan elephants, Sri Lankan leopards and aquatic birds.

There are six national parks and three wildlife sanctuaries in the vicinity of Yala. Among the largest is Lunugamvehera National Park. The park is situated in the dry semi-arid climatic region and rain is received mainly during the northeast monsoon. Yala hosts a variety of ecosystems ranging from moist monsoon forests to freshwater and marine wetlands. It is one of the 70 Important Bird Areas (IBAs) in Sri Lanka. Yala harbours 215 bird species including six endemic species of Sri Lanka. The number of mammals that has been recorded from the park is 44, and it has one of the highest leopard densities in the world.

The area around Yala has hosted several ancient civilizations. Two important Buddhist pilgrim sites, Sithulpahuwa and Magul Vihara, are situated within the park. The 2004 Indian Ocean tsunami caused severe damage on the Yala National Park and 250 people died in its vicinity. The number of visitors has been on the rise since 2009, after the security situation in the park improved.

History 
In 1560 Spanish cartographer Cipriano Sanchez noted Yala in his map "is abandoned for 300 years due to insalubrious conditions." Chief Justice Sir Alexander Johnston wrote a detailed account on Yala in 1806 after travelling from Trincomalee to Hambantota. On March 23, 1900, the government proclaimed Yala and Wilpattu reserves under the Forest Ordinance. At that time the reserve did not bear the name Yala. The Game Protection Society (now the Wildlife and Nature Protection Society) was instrumental in establishing the reserve. The forest area between Palatupana and Yala was declared a hunting site reserved only for the resident sportsmen. Henry Engelbrecht was appointed as the first park warden.

On 1 March 1938, Yala became a national park when the Flora and Fauna Protection Ordinance was passed into law by D. S. Senanayake, the minister of agriculture. The park consists of five blocks. Subsequently, four other blocks were incorporated to the park. There are six national parks and three wildlife sanctuaries in the vicinity of Yala. Kumana National Park, Yala Strict Nature Reserve and Kataragama, Katagamuwa, and Nimalawa sanctuaries are continuous with the park.

Physical features 

The Yala area is mostly composed of metamorphic rock belonging to the Precambrian era and classified into two series, Vijayan series and Highland series. Reddish brown soil and low humic grey soil are prominent among six soil types. Yala is situated in the lowest peneplain of Sri Lanka, which extends from Trincomalee to Hambantota. The national park is situated in the dry semi-arid climatic region and rain is received mainly during the northeast monsoon.

Water is abundant after the northeast monsoon, but during the dry season surface water becomes an important factor. The bodies of surface water appear in the forms of streams, tanks, waterholes, rock pools, and lagoons. Waterholes occur in low lying places while rock pools of varying size are capable of containing water year-round, and are hence an important source of water for elephants. For many water birds and water buffaloes natural waterholes are ideal habitats. Such reservoirs are largely concentrated to the Block I followed by Block II. Several tanks  are there including, Maha Seelawa, Buthawa, Uraniya, and Pilinnawa tanks. Many rivers and streams flow in a southeasterly direction, originating in the highlands of adjacent Uva and central hills. Kumbukkan Oya in the east and Menik River and its tributaries in the west flow across the park, and provide an important water source in the dry season to wild animals of the park. Normally the streams of the park are dry during the drought season. These rivers and streams exhibit a degree of runoff fluctuations between wet and dry seasons. Kumbukkan Oya discharges seven times as much water in the rainy season than in the dry season. A number of lagoons are situated along the coast line of the park.

Impact of the 2004 tsunami 
Yala lay in the direct path of the 2004 Indian Ocean tsunami, which impacted Sri Lanka 90 minutes after its generation. The tsunami caused severe but localized damage on the park, with around 250 people being killed. The tsunami waves reached inland only through the river-mouth gaps in the coastal dunes. The main habitats affected are scrub forest and grasslands. About  of grassland, forest, and wetland were directly affected by the tsunami. The satellite images revealed that mean normalized difference vegetation index (NDVI) range from 0.245 to 0.772 in the Block I and II. After the disaster the NDVI value fell dramatically to 0.2111. Around 60% of the area along the coastline has changed. The damage was worse closer to the sea. The movement patterns of two radio collared elephants were analyzed. The study found out that their movements were consistent with behaviour prompted by immediate cues generated by the tsunami waves rather than a response to a "sixth sense".

Flora 

Yala National Park has a variety of ecosystems including moist monsoon forests, dry monsoon forests, semi deciduous forests, thorn forests, grasslands, marshes, marine wetlands, and sandy beaches. The area under forest cover mainly consists of Block I and rangelands of open parkland (pelessa grasslands) including some extensive grasslands. The forest area is restricted to around the Menik River while rangelands are found towards the sea side. Other habitat types of the Block I are tanks and water holes, lagoons and mangroves and chena lands. The mangrove vegetation in the Buthuwa lagoon is largely Rhizophora mucronata while Avicennia spp. and Aegiceras spp. are less abundant. The vegetation of Block II is similar to those of Block I, and Yalawela, once a fertile paddy field, represents pitiya grasslands. The common mangrove plants are Rhizophora mucronata, Sonneratia caseolaris, Avicennia spp., and Aegiceras corniculatum. The lagoons of Pilinnawa, Mahapothana, and Pahalapothana are also located in this block. The other common mangrove species are Acanthus ilicifolius, Excoecaria agallocha, and Lumnitzera racemosa. In the bare sand Crinum zeylanicum is found.

In the Blocks III, IV, and V, forests are more widespread. The canopy of the forest mainly contains Drypetes sepiaria and Manilkara hexandra plant species. The Pitiya grasslands are important for grazing animals. Cynodon barberi is the common grass in pitiya grasslands while Zoysia matrella becomes dominant near the beach. Among 300 odd floral species are Manilkara hexandra, Drypetes sepiaria, Ceylon satinwood, Terminalia arjuna, limonia, Berrya cordifolia, Randia dumetorum, Pleurostylia opposita, Gymnema sylvestre, bell mimosa, neem, banyan, toothbrush tree, Schleichera oleosa, Vitex pinnata, Indian blackberry, Gmelina asiatica, Carissa spinarum, Euphorbia antiquorum, and Acacia eburnea. In the seasonally flooded areas of Block II, a wild species of rice is found. Glenniea unijuga is an endemic plant species found around the wetlands of the park. Munronia pumila, Salacia reticulata, and Asparagus racemosus are some medicinal plants.

Fauna

Birds 

Yala is one of the 70 Important Bird Areas (IBAs) in Sri Lanka. Of 215 bird species of the park, seven are endemic to Sri Lanka. They are Sri Lanka grey hornbill, Sri Lanka junglefowl, Sri Lanka wood pigeon, crimson-fronted barbet, black-capped bulbul, blue-tailed bee-eater and brown-capped babbler. The number of waterbirds inhabiting wetlands of Yala is 90 and half of them are migrants. Waterfowl (lesser whistling duck, garganey), cormorants (little cormorant, Indian cormorant), large waterbirds (grey heron, black-headed ibis, Eurasian spoonbill, Asian openbill, painted stork), medium-sized waders Tringa spp., and small waders Charadrius spp. are among the most common waterbirds. Black-necked stork and lesser adjutant are many of the rare birds that can be seen in the park. The migrant great white pelican and resident spot-billed pelican are also have been recorded. Other waterbirds attracted to the Yala lagoons include lesser flamingo, pelicans, and rare species such as purple heron, night herons, egrets, purple swamphen, and Oriental darter. Thousands of waterfowls migrate to the lagoons of Yala during the northeast monsoon. They are northern pintail, white-winged tern, Eurasian curlew, Eurasian whimbrel, godwits, and ruddy turnstone. The visiting species mingled with residing lesser whistling duck, yellow-wattled lapwing, red-wattled lapwing, and great stone-curlew. Rock pigeon, barred buttonquail, Indian peafowl, black stork, black-winged stilt, and greater flamingo are among the other bird species. Crested serpent eagle and white-bellied sea eagle are the raptors of the park. The forest birds are orange-breasted green pigeon, hornbills, Old World flycatchers, Indian paradise flycatcher, Asian barbets, and orioles.

Mammals 

Including Sri Lankan elephant, 44 species of mammals are resident in Yala National Park, and it has one of the highest leopard densities in the world. 25 individual leopards are estimated to roam in Block I. The elephant herd of Yala contains 300–350 individuals. The Sri Lankan sloth bear, leopard, elephant, and wild water buffalo are all threatened mammals that Yala harbours. Although water buffaloes are indigenous to Sri Lanka, most populations contain genes of the domestic stock or have descended from feral populations. Toque macaque, golden palm civet, red slender loris, and fishing cat are among the other mammals that can be seen in Yala. The elephant population of the park varies seasonally.

Reptiles 

The reptile fauna recorded from the park is 47 and six of them are endemic. Sri Lankan krait, Boulenger's keelback, Sri Lankan flying snake, painted-lip lizard, Wiegmann's agama, and Bahir's fan-throated lizard are the endemic species. The coastal line of the park is visited by the all five globally endangered sea turtles (leatherback turtle, olive ridley, loggerhead sea turtle, hawksbill turtle, and green turtle) that visit Sri Lanka. The two breeding crocodile species of Sri Lanka, mugger crocodile and saltwater crocodile, inhabit the park. The Indian cobra and Russell's viper are among the other reptiles.

Amphibians 
There are 18 amphibian species that have been recorded from Yala, while Bufo atukoralei and Adenomus kelaartii are endemic to Sri Lanka.

Fish 
In the water courses of Yala, 21 freshwater fish are found. The fish population in the perennial reservoirs contain mostly exotic food fish Mozambique tilapia. The stone sucker and Esomus thermoicos are endemic among other species. The blackspot barb, olive barb, orange chromide and common spiny loach are the common fish species.

Invertebrates 
Crabs and prawns include the fauna in the lagoons of the park.

A variety of butterfly species is found here. The common bluebottle, common lime butterfly, crimson rose, common Jezebel, and common Mormon are the common species.

Cultural importance 

Yala had been a center of past civilisations. King Ravana, the mythical Hindu anti-hero is believed to have established his kingdom here with Ravana Kotte, now submerged in the sea, as its boundary. Seafaring traders brought Indo-Aryan civilisation with them, as Yala is situated in their trading route. A large number of ancient although disrepaired tanks are the evidence of a rich hydraulic and agricultural civilisation dating back to 5th century BC. Situlpahuwa, which was the home for 12,000 arahants, is situated within the park area along with Magul Vihara, which built in 87 BC and Akasa Chaitiya, which constructed in 2nd century BC. Agriculture flourished in area during the period of Ruhuna Kingdom. According to Mahavamsa, the Kingdom of Ruhuna began to decline by the end of the 13th century AD. During the colonial period Yala became a popular hunting ground. Yala is annually visited by 400,000 pilgrims.

Threats and conservation 
Poaching, gem-mining, logging, encroachment by agriculture, and free-roaming domestic livestock are the main threats to the park. Three wardens have been killed in clashes with poachers. In Blocks III and IV, the encroachment is severe as chena cultivation and burning, to provide grazing in the dry season, collides with the boundary. A large grove of Sonneratia caseolaris is faced with forest dieback in the Menik River's estuary. Cultivation of tobacco, noise and air pollutions caused by uncontrolled tourism are the other conservation issues. The growth of invasive alien species such as Lantana camara, Opuntia dillenii, Chromolaena odorata is threatening the native plants.

Deep within the forest, Ganja is cultivated in cleared areas. The wildlife is poached and disturbed by the fishermen at Patanangala. The turtles are caught in fishing nets and the fishermen also litter the beach with debris. They have also set traps inland and dig up turtle nests. In the absence of hand-weeding, which was practiced until the 1950s, the transformation of interior grasslands to scrub jungle is unavoidable. The tourism has created problems in the past, such as vehicles harassing wild animals. The issue is most severe in Sithulpahuwa where thousands of pilgrims visit, leading to a great degree of commercialisation. Department of Wildlife Conservation has taken some conservation measures such as management of grazing lands, conservation of small water ponds, and eradication of invasive alien species.

Tourism 

The Yala National Park is the most visited park in Sri Lanka. In 2002 around 156,867 tourists visited the park. Foreigners, especially Europeans, account for 30% of total visitors. Block I is the main area for visits. Block III (main gate in Galge area, on Buttala-Kataragama Road) and the adjoining Kumana Park or 'Yala East'  (main gate at Okanda, on the east coast not far from Pottuvil) however are becoming popular in their own right too.

Note that the Situlpahuwa pilgrimage site, geographically in Block III, has kind of an 'enclave' status and is accessible FOC through separate roads from Tissa and Kataragama. Most of the visitors stated that reasons for their visit is to see wild animals, and elephant is the most preferred animal. The visitors like to see bears, leopards, birds as well. In 2000 the income from visitors including lodge fees was approximately 468,629. Due to security conditions revenue was lost. The Yala National Park has been susceptible to terrorist attacks. On 17 October 2007 a group of LTTE cadres attacked an army detachment in Thalgasmankada in the park. The attack killed six army soldiers and another was caught up in a landmine explosion. On 11 July 2008 four people died in an attack launched by the LTTE. The cadres opened fire at a bus carrying pilgrims to Kataragama. Since the end of the civil war, May 2009, no violence has occurred in Yala area also and it is fully safe for visitors; this was also the main factor in opening blocks III and V for tourists.

From January to June in 2008, 9,078 local tourists and 7,532 foreigners have visited Yala. For the same period of time in 2009 the arrivals have risen to 18,031 locals and foreigners to 10,439. Accordingly, the revenue increased to Rs. 27 million (235,000) in 2009 from Rs. 16.6 million (154,000) in 2008. The visitors are allowed to see the wild animals from 5.30 am to 6.30 pm. Due to droughts the park used to be closed to tourists from 1 September, to 15 October annually; however in 2009 and 2010 the closure was skipped and lakes filled with water bowsers for drinking water for the animals, a future strategy on drought handling is not yet clear.

See also

References

External links 

 Official website for Yala National Park

Important Bird Areas of Sri Lanka
National parks of Sri Lanka
Protected areas established in 1900
Protected areas in Southern Province, Sri Lanka
Protected areas in Uva Province
Sri Lanka dry-zone dry evergreen forests